Niklas Roger "Nicke" Borg, born 3 April 1973, is a Swedish singer and guitarist in the band Backyard Babies.

Career
Nicke Borg was born in Nässjö. He was part of the Backyard Babies, a Swedish rock band, from 1989 onwards, as lead vocals and rhythm guitarist. The band was formed in 1987 under the name Tyrant with bassist Tobbe (Tobias Fischer) as lead vocals and guitarist Dregen, guitarist Johan Blomqvist, and drummer Peder Carlsson. Nicke Borg replaced Tobbe as frontman two years after the formation of the band. Blomqvist switched to bass at the same time. Over the years they have released six studio albums and won a Swedish Grammy.

Nicke Borg Homeland
While the Backyard Babies took a break, Borg worked on his solo project Nicke Borg Homeland. Homeland has released an EP, "Chapter 1" and one full-length album called "Chapter 2". "Chapter 2" was released in January 2012 and Ruins of a Riot in 2013.

Melodifestivalen
Nicke Borg participated in Melodifestivalen 2011 in the race in Malmö where he went on to number two with premium "Leaving Home" to the final inside the Stockholm Globe Arena. The song was co-written by Borg with Jojo Borg Larsson, Fredrik Thomander and Anders "Gary" Wikström. In the final, he finished 8th in 10 finalists. The title was won by Eric Saade and "Popular"

In popular culture
Nicke Borg is one of the characters in the book Sex Tips from Rock Stars by Paul Miles published by Omnibus Press in July 2010.

Nicke Borg got his own radio show on radio station Bandit Rock. His radio show broadcasts from 22:00 to 00:00 every Thursday.

Discography

Albums
as part of Backyard Babies
(Refer to discography section on Backyard Babies page)

Solo single

as Nicke Borg Homeland

References

External links
 Backyard Babies official website
 Nicke Borg's official website
 Backyard Babies French Forum Unofficial

1973 births
Living people
Swedish rock guitarists
Swedish rock musicians
21st-century guitarists
Backyard Babies members
People from Nässjö Municipality
English-language singers from Sweden
Melodifestivalen contestants of 2011